Domhnall O'Donovan (born 29 April 1988) is an Irish hurler who plays as a right corner-back for the Clare senior team.

Born in Clonlara, County Clare, O'Donovan first played competitive hurling whilst at school in St. Munchin's College. He arrived on the inter-county scene at the age of twenty-one when he first linked up with the Clare under-21 team. He made his senior debut in the 2010 Waterford Crystal Cup. O'Donovan has since gone on to play a key role in defence for Clare.

At club level O'Donovan has won one championship medal with Clonlara.

O'Donovan played a key part in the drawn 2013 All Ireland Senior Hurling Final on 8 September against Cork. Despite leading for the whole game Clare found themselves a point down after 72 minutes. O'Donovan scored his first ever championship point coming from corner back to send the match to a replay which Clare won.

In February 2016, O'Donovan announced that he had left the Clare senior hurling panel due to work commitments.

O'Donovan attended NUI Galway. There he studied civil engineering, previously having engineered for himself a total of 530 Leaving Certificate points. His twin brother Cormac was a student of the same course at Galway as well. Both were part of the university hurling team during their winning 2010 Fitzgibbon Cup campaign.

Honours

Team
NUI Galway
Fitzgibbon Cup (1): 2010

Clonlara
Clare Senior Hurling Championship (1): 2008
Munster Intermediate Hurling Championship (1) : 2007
Clare Intermediate Hurling Championship (1) : 2007

Clare
All-Ireland Senior Hurling Championship (1): 2013
All-Ireland Under-21 Hurling Championship (1): 2009
Munster Under-21 Hurling Championship (1): 2009

References

1988 births
Living people
Alumni of the University of Galway
Clare inter-county hurlers
Clonlara hurlers
University of Galway hurlers
Irish twins
Twin sportspeople